The Swedish Competition Authority is a Swedish government agency organized under the Ministry of Enterprise tasked to promote and safeguard competition in the private and public sector, to the benefit of all consumers and market participants. The agency ensures that contracting authorities comply with public procurement rules, propose legislative changes to improve competition, disseminates information about the rules that apply, and provides grants for research on competition and procurement.

History
The agency was founded in 1992, when it replaced the National Price and Competition Board and Office of the Competition Ombudsman.

In 2007 the Board for Public Procurement was dissolved, and its operations – oversight on public procurement – were taken over by the Swedish Competition Authority.

Organisation
The agency is based in Stockholm, and is led by Director-General Dan Sjöblom. It is organised in into six departments and eight units.

See also
Ministry of Enterprise, Energy and Communications (Sweden)
Government procurement

References

External links
The Swedish Competition Authority – Official website (In English, also available in a number of other languages.)

Government agencies of Sweden
1992 establishments in Sweden
Government procurement in the European Union